MV  Biokovo is a ro-ro vehicle and passenger ferry owned and operated by Jadrolinija, the Croatian state-owned ferry company. She was built in July 2009 by the Brodosplit shipyard in Split, Croatia. As of June 2010 she serves on the Split—Supetar route.

MV Biokovo is a Hull 515 class ferry, along with her twin, the MV Jadran, which was also built at Brodosplit in May 2010. These two ferries were commissioned as part of Jadrolinija's fleet renewal program, which (as of June 2010) include a total of eight newly built ships since 2004. These including two other Hull 515 class ferries, the MV Hrvat and MV Juraj Dalmatinac which had been built by the Kraljevica shipyard and delivered in 2007.

References

External links
MV Biokovo at the Jadrolinija official website  
Zaplovio trajekt Jadran at Agencija-ZOLPP.hr 

Ferries of Croatia
Ships built in Croatia
2009 ships